The Department of Defense Education Activity (DoDEA) is a federal school system headquartered in Alexandria, Virginia, responsible for planning, directing, coordinating, and managing prekindergarten through 12th grade educational programs on behalf of the United States Department of Defense (DoD). DoDEA is globally positioned, operating 163 accredited schools in 8 districts located in 11 foreign countries, 7 states, Guam, and Puerto Rico.

DoDEA employs 15,000 employees who serve 71,000 children of active duty military and DoD civilian families.

DoDEA operates as a field activity of the Office of the Secretary of Defense (Personnel and Readiness). It is headed by a director who oversees all agency functions from DoDEA headquarters in Alexandria. DoDEA's schools are divided into 3 geographic areas: Europe, the Pacific, and the Americas.

It is one of two U.S. federal government school systems, along with the Bureau of Indian Education (BIE).

History 
Shortly after the end of World War II, the United States military established schools for the children of its service men and women stationed in Europe and the Pacific. Schools for children of military members stationed at various bases in the United States were already well-established. First administered by the military branches they served, the growing number of schools was soon transferred to civilian managers, then organized into two separate but parallel systems: the Department of Defense Dependents Schools (Pacific and Europe) overseas, and the Department of Defense Domestic Dependent Elementary and Secondary Schools (Americas) in the United States. In 1994 the two systems were brought together under an umbrella agency, the Department of Defense Education Activity (DoDEA).

Activities 
The DoDEA instructional program provides a prekindergarten through 12th grade curriculum. Currently 100% of DoDEA schools are accredited and in good standing with their regional accrediting agency. Students consistently achieve high scores in the National Assessment of Educational Progress and above the national average on standardized assessments. Minority students have been especially successful, scoring at or near the highest in the United States in mathematics.

DoDEA measures student progress with multiple performance-based assessments. The TerraNova standardized test provides DoDEA with results that it can compare to a nationwide sample. DoDEA students also take the National Assessment of Educational Progress (NAEP), which provides comparisons of student achievement in reading, writing, math, and science. All DoDEA schools are accredited by the North Central Association Commission on Accreditation and School Improvement (NCA CASI) or the Southern Association of Colleges and Schools Council on Accreditation and School Improvement (SACS CASI), which provide each school with an independent evaluation.

Schools submit annual reports of data, and every five years they host an on-site validation visit led by education experts from the United States. Following the on-site visits, the experts send a report that includes recommendations for improvements to each of the schools visited. DoDEA conducts internal monitoring of educational programs to ensure high-quality implementation of new programs and overall effectiveness of existing programs. Monitoring activities may include, but are not limited to the following activities: surveys, interviews, focus groups, classroom observations and the analysis of achievement and training data. Currently 100% of DoDEA schools are accredited and in good standing.

Operations
In 2008 the U.S. Congress published a study stating that decreased military budgets resulted in 70% of the DoDEA schools having campuses in less than ideal physical condition, with their conditions specifically noted as either "poor" or "failing".

A 2015 editorial of the Minneapolis Star-Tribune noted that schools in the DoDEA, were well funded, partly due to post-September 11 attacks security concerns and partly because of the size of the DOD itself, as well as the leadership of Robert Gates, who served as the Secretary of Defense. The Star-Tribune contrasted this with the lesser-funded Bureau of Indian Education (BIE) network, also federal and serving Native American students.

Academic achievement
In 2001 the Government Accountability Office (GAO) wrote "The academic achievement of DOD students, as measured by their performance on standardized tests and their plans for enrolling in college, generally exceeds that of elementary and secondary students nationwide. On college admission tests, DOD students score at or near national averages."

DoDEA Americas Region 
Headquartered in Peachtree City, Georgia, in the Atlanta metropolitan area, DoDEA Americas is divided into 2 school districts (Americas Mid-Atlantic and Americas Southeast) and operates 51 schools at 16 military communities on the U.S. mainland, Puerto Rico, and Cuba. As of May 2019, it educates approximately 22,000 students of U.S. military and eligible DoD civilian personnel families.

DoDEA Americas' Mid-Atlantic District

Camp Lejeune, NC 

 Bitz IS
 Brewster MS
 Heroes ES
 Johnson PS
 Lejeune HS
 Tarawa Terrace ES
(note DeLalio ES is at MCAS New River)

Fort Bragg, NC 

 Albritton MS
 Bowley ES
 Devers ES
 Gary Ivan Gordon ES - In the Linden Oaks area
 Hampton PS
 Irwin IS
 Poole ES
 Randall David Shughart ES - In Linden Oaks
 Shughart MS - In Linden Oaks

High school students attend local public schools based on what county they reside in: Cumberland County Schools for Cumberland County residents, and Hoke County Schools for Hoke County residents. The Cumberland County parts are assigned to EE Smith High School.

The Linden Oaks area is in Harnett County Schools, and is assigned to Overhills High School.

Marine Corps Air Station New River, NC 
 DeLalio ES
Brewster Middle School and Lejeune High School in Camp Lejeune serve the community for secondary school.

Naval Surface Warfare Center Dahlgren Division, VA 

 Dahlgren ES/MS
 The school first opened in 1921. The school's principal facility was built during World War II. In 2011 a review of the building found that it was in "poor" shape.

King George County Public Schools operates non-DoDEA public schools in King George County. Most off-post persons associated with NSF Dahlgren send their children to King George County schools. King George High School is the local county high school.

Marine Corps Base Quantico, VA 

 Crossroads ES
The  facility was scheduled to open in Spring 2016. It had a cost of $47 million. It has a two-story media center and a rooftop environmental science center, patio, and garden. The facility uses natural light and heating from geothermal sources. In 2015 the Star-Tribune described it as "state-of-the-art school design". It replaced Ashurst, Burrows, and Russell elementary schools in Quantico.
 Quantico MS/HS

USMA West Point, NY 

 West Point ES
 West Point MS

The academy is physically in the Highland Falls Central School District. The military installation sends students to James I. O'Neill High School of Highland Falls for high School,under contract. Pre-school through 8th grade attend school on the military academy grounds. The elementary school and the middle school are part of the DoDEA system, not in the Highland Falls School District.  In 2021, 190 high school children living on post attended James I O'Neill High School. In 2021 the agency at West Point announced that the bid to educate West Point High School students would be competitive. In March 2022 the O'Neill contract was renewed.

Guantanamo Bay Naval Station, Cuba 

 W.T. Sampson ES/HS

Coast Guard Air Station Borinquen, PR 

 Ramey Unit School

Fort Buchanan, PR 

 Antilles ES
 Antilles MS
 Antilles HS

DoDEA Americas' Southeast District

Fort Benning, GA 

 Dexter ES
 Faith MS
 McBride ES
 Stowers ES
 White ES

High school students attend local public high schools operated by county governments. The portion in Muscogee County is zoned to high schools of Muscogee County Schools. The portion in Chattahoochie County is zoned to Chattahoochee County Schools. Off-base families attend county school systems, with residents of Georgia attending those systems, and Alabama residents being in Lee County Schools and Russell County Schools.

Fort Campbell, KY 

 Barkley ES
 Barsanti ES
 Fort Campbell HS
 Lucas ES
 Mahaffey MS
 Marshall ES

The high school first opened in 1962. The current high school building was dedicated in 2018. Of the students, the percentage who attend for all four years total at FCHS is 10.

There were plans for a new middle school, but in 2019 the funds were instead designated for a wall along the Mexico-United States border.

Fort Jackson, SC 
The DoDEA schools on-post for Fort Jackson are Pierce Terrace Elementary School (Pre-Kindergarten through Grade 1) and C.C. Pinckney Elementary School (grades 2–6). Students are zoned to non-DoDEA schools for secondary school: Dent Middle School and Richland Northeast High School, which are operated by Richland County School District Two.

Fort Knox, KY 

 Fort Knox Middle High School
 Scott Intermediate School
 Van Voorhis ES 
 Kingsolver ES

Fort Rucker, AL 

 Ellis D. Parker Elementary School

Students beyond the elementary level may attend non-DoDEA schools for secondary levels, with an on-post family choosing one of the following three options: Daleville City School System, Enterprise City School System, or Ozark City Schools. Enterprise operates Enterprise High School and Ozark operates Carroll High School.

Fort Stewart, GA 

 Diamond ES
 Kessler ES
 Murray ES

Students at the secondary level on Fort Stewart attend public schools operated by county school districts. Liberty County School District operates the public schools in Liberty County.

Maxwell Air Force Base, AL 

 Maxwell AFB ES/MS Magnet

For high school residents are zoned to Montgomery Public Schools facilities: residents of the main base are zoned to George Washington Carver High School, while residents of the Gunner Annex are zoned to Robert E. Lee High School. Residents may attend magnet schools.

Marine Corps Air Station Beaufort, SC 

 Bolden ES/MS
 Elliott ES

Beaufort County School District operates public high schools serving MCAS Beaufort, and in sum has the highest number of students, of any school system, affiliated with MCAS Beaufort.

DoDEA Europe Region 
Headquartered in Kapaun AS, Kaiserslautern, Germany, DoDEA Europe is organized into 3 districts (EU East, EU South, and EU West) and operates 65 schools within 27 U.S. military communities across Europe. As of May 2019, the DoDEA European region educates approximately 27,000 children of U.S. military and eligible DoD civilian personnel families.

DoDEA Europe East District

USAG Ansbach, Germany 

 Ansbach ES  
 Ansbach MS/HS

Baumholder Military Community, Germany (USAG Rheinland-Pfalz) 

 Baumholder MS/HS
 Smith ES

Garmisch Military Community, Germany USAG Bavaria 

 Garmisch ES/MS

Grafenwohr/Vilseck Military Community, USAG Bavaria, Germany 

 Grafenwoehr ES 
 Netzaberg ES 
 Netzaberg MS 
 Vilseck ES 
 Vilseck HS

Hohenfels Military Community, Germany USAG Bavaria, Germany 

 Hohenfels ES 
 Hohenfels HS

Kaiserslautern Military Community (KMC), Germany 

 Kaiserslautern ES  
 Kaiserslautern MS  
Kaiserslautern HS
 Landstuhl ES/MS  
 Sembach ES  
 Sembach MS  
 Vogelweh ES

Ramstein AB, Germany (Part of KMC) 

Ramstein ES
Ramstein HS
 Ramstein IS
 Ramstein MS

USAG Stuttgart, Germany 

 Patch ES 
 Patch MS 
 Robinson Barracks ES 
 Stuttgart ES 
 Stuttgart HS

USAG Wiesbaden, Germany 

 Aukamm ES 
Wiesbaden HS
 Wiesbaden MS
 Hainerberg ES

DoDEA Europe South District

Ankara American Community, Turkey 

 Ankara ES/MS/HS

Aviano AB, Italy 

 Aviano ES  
 Aviano MS/HS

Naval Support Activity Bahrain 

 Bahrain ES/HS

Camp Darby Military Community, USAG Italy 

 Livorno ES/MS

Naval Support Activity Naples, Italy 

 Naples ES 
 Naples MS/HS

Naval Air Station Rota, Spain 

 Rota ES  
 Rota MS/HS

Moron AB, Seville, Spain 

 Sevilla ES/MS

Sigonella Air Station, Sicily (IT) 

 Sigonella ES 
 Sigonella MS/HS

Vicenza Military Community, USAG Italy 

 Vicenza ES  
 Vicenza MS 
 Vicenza HS

DoDEA Europe West District

Schinnen Military Community, USAG Benelux, Brunssum, The Netherlands 

 AFNORTH ES  
 AFNORTH MS/HS

RAF Alconbury, United Kingdom 

 Alconbury ES  
Alconbury MS/HS

Brussels Military Community, USAG Benelux, Belgium 

 Brussels ES/HS

RAF Croughton, United Kingdom 

 Croughton ES

Kleine Brogel Air Base, USAG Benelux Belgium 

 Kleine Brogel ES

RAF Lakenheath, United Kingdom 

 Feltwell ES  
 Lakenheath ES  
 Lakenheath HS
 Liberty IS

SHAPE Military Community, US Army Garrison Benelux, Mons, Belgium 

 SHAPE ES  
 SHAPE MS
SHAPE HS

Spangdahlem Air Base, Germany 

 Spangdahlem ES 
 Spangdahlem MS 
 Spangdahlem HS

DoDEA Pacific Region 

Headquartered in Yokota AB, Japan, the DoDEA Pacific region is organized into 3 districts (Pacific East, Pacific South, and Pacific West) and operates 47 schools on 21 U.S. military installations in Guam, Japan, Okinawa and South Korea. As of May 2019, the DoDEA Pacific Region educates over 22,000 children of U.S. military and eligible DoD civilian personnel families.

Pacific East District

Camp Zama, Kanagawa Prefecture, Japan 

 Arnn American ES
 Zama American MS/HS

Commander Fleet Activities Sasebo 

 Darby ES
 E.J. King MS/HS
 Sasebo ES

Commander Fleet Activities Yokosuka 

 Ikego ES
 Kinnick HS
 Sullivans ES
 Yokosuka MS

Marine Corp Air Station Iwakuni 

 Iwakuni ES
 Iwakuni MS
 M.C. Perry ES
 M.B. Perry HS

Misawa Air Base 

 Edgren HS
 Sollars ES

NAF Atsugi 

 Lanham ES

Yokota Air Base 

 Mendel ES
 Yokota MS
 Yokota HS
 Yokota West ES

Pacific South District

Andersen AFB (Guam) 

 Andersen ES
 Andersen MS

Camp Foster, Okinawa 

 Killin ES 
 Kubasaki HS
 Zukeran ES

Camp Kinser, Okinawa 

 Kinser ES

Camp Lester, Okinawa 

 Lester MS

Camp McTureous, Okinawa 

 Bechtel ES

Kadena Airforce Base, Okinawa 

 Amelia Earhart IS 
 Bob Hope PS
 Kadena ES
 Kadena HS
 Kadena MS 
 Ryukyu MS 
 Stearley Heights ES

Naval Base Guam 

 McCool ES/MS

U.S. Naval Hospital (Guam) 

 Guam HS

Pacific West District

Osan Air Base 

 Osan American ES  
 Osan American MS/HS

Osan American Middle High School formed in 2017 with the consolidation of the middle and high schools. In September 2017 it had 320 students.

US Army Garrison Daegu – Camp George 

 Daegu American ES

US Army Garrison Daegu – Camp Walker 

 Daegu MS/HS

Daegu Middle High School formed in 2017 with the consolidation of the middle and high schools. In September 2017 it had 299 students.

US Army Garrison Humphreys 

 Humphreys Central ES 
 Humphreys West ES
 Humphreys MS
 Humphreys HS

Former schools 
 Iceland
 AT Mahan High School (Keflavik)
 AT Mahan Elementary School (Keflavik)

 Panama
 Balboa HS 
 Curundu ES
 On Fort Clayton, it operated from 1968 to 1999.
 Curundu MS
 Fort Clayton ES
 Fort Kobbe ES
 Howard ES

 Philippines
 Wagner High School (Clark Air Base)

 United Kingdom
 London Central Elementary High School (formerly London Central High School)
 West Ruislip Elementary School

See also
 Department of Defense Dependents Schools
 List of schools in United States territories

References

External links

Official DoDEA Website

 
Education Activity